Upindauara bella is a species of beetle in the family Cerambycidae, the only species in the genus Upindauara.

References

Compsocerini